This is a list of episodes for the CBS television series Switch.

Series overview
At present, this series has not been released on home video.

Episodes

Pilot (1975)
This pilot is divided into two parts for syndication. Co-director Allen Baron goes uncredited.

Season 1 (1975–76)

Season 2 (1976–77)

Season 3 (1977–78)

External links
 

Switch